Phycotechnology refers to the  technological applications of algae, both microalgae and macroalgae.

Uses

Sewage reclamation

Currently micro-algae are being exploited for environmental protection as the species of Chlorella, Chlamydomonas, and Scenedesmus carry out selective uptake, accumulation and biodegradation of pollutants and thus help in remediation. They are used in biological reclamation of sewage since they can immobilize heavy metals from aquatic systems.

Insecticide

Microalgae can be used as biocontrol agents like 'Insect' a commercial bio-insecticide sold in USA, prepared from the dead biomass of diatom frustules.

Fuel creation

Algae are an excellent feed stock for green fuel as they are used for the production of biodiesel, bioethanol, biogasoline, biomethanol, biobutanol, and recently biohydrogen.

Healthcare
Microalgae are of significant use in healthcare.  Chlorellin from the green microalga Chlorella is an effective antibiotic against Gram positive and Gram-negative bacteria.

Other uses
Algae is extremely useful in various fields. An example for natural phycotechnology is the converting of atmospheric nitrogen into bioaccessible nitrogenous compounds by diazotrophic cyanobacteria (blue-green algae). Species of cyanobacteria like Nostoc, Arthrospira (Spirulina) and Aphanizomenon are used as food and feed due to their easy digestibility and nutrient content. Species of Dunaliella provide products like glycerol, carotenoids, and proteins. Algal-produced proteins can be biofactories for the production of therapeutic substances.

References

Algae
Biotechnology
Agricultural technology
Algaculture